Hajjiabad (also Romanized as Ḩājjīābād) is a village in Masumiyeh Rural District, in the Central District of Arak County, Markazi Province, Iran. At the 2006 census, its population was 948, in 240 families.

References 

Populated places in Arak County